Montebuono is a village in Tuscany, central Italy, administratively a frazione of the comune of Sorano, province of Grosseto, in the tuff area of southern Maremma. At the time of the 2001 census its population amounted to 37.

Montebuono is about 75 km from Grosseto and 12 km from Sorano, and it is situated along the Provincial Road which links Castell'Azzara and Elmo to Sovana. The village was known as Tucciano in the Middle Ages. It is composed by two hamlets: Appalto and Dispensa.

Main sights 
 Sant'Andrea (13th century), main parish church of the village, it was built in the 13th century and later restructured many times. It contains some late-Renaissance paintings.
 Madonna del Cerro (17th century), church in the hamlet of Dispensa, it was built in 1686. It was restored in 1982.
 Castle of Montebuono, old castle of the village, it's now in ruins.

References

Bibliography 
 Aldo Mazzolai, Guida della Maremma. Percorsi tra arte e natura, Florence, Le Lettere, 1997.

See also 
 Castell'Ottieri
 Cerreto, Sorano
 Elmo, Sorano
 Montevitozzo
 Montorio, Sorano
 San Giovanni delle Contee
 San Quirico, Sorano
 San Valentino, Sorano
 Sovana

Frazioni of Sorano